Leucopogon rubricaulis is an Australian species of shrub described by Robert Brown.

References

rubricaulis
Flora of Australia
Taxa named by Robert Brown (botanist, born 1773)